NR, Nr or nr may refer to:

Arts and media
 National Review, an American political magazine
 Newsround, a British news programme for children
 Nollywood Reinvented, a Nigerian cinematic review website
 Numerical Recipes, a series of books on numerical computation
 Not Rated, referring to a work without a content rating in North America

Places 
 NR postcode area, UK, for the area surrounding Norwich, England
 Nauru (ISO 3166-1 country code)
 .nr, the country code top-level domain for Nauru
 North Riding of Yorkshire, England
 Northern Rhodesia
 New Rockford, North Dakota, US

Businesses and organizations

Military bodies
 National Resources Division, the domestic division of the United States Central Intelligence Agency
 Naval Reserve (disambiguation), various bodies
 Naval Reactors, the governing body of the United States Navy Nuclear Power Program

Rail bodies in Great Britain
 National Rail, a generic term for passenger services
 Network Rail, the state-owned track owner (2002–2023)
 Northern Rail, a train operating company (2004–2016)
 Northern Railway (India)

Other businesses and organizations
 Northern Rock, a defunct British bank (1965–2012)
 Norwegian Computing Center (NR, in Norwegian: Norsk Regnesentral)
 Networked Robotics Corporation
 New Right (Netherlands), a former Dutch political party

Language
 Nr., a numero sign in some languages
 Southern Ndebele language, a Bantu language spoken in South Africa (ISO 639-1 code: NR)

Science and technology

Biochemistry
 Nuclear receptor, a class of receptor proteins in the cell
 Nicotinamide riboside, a form of Vitamin B3
 Reactive nitrogen (Nr)

Computing and telecommunications

 .nr, the top-level domain for Nauru
 New Radio, a fifth generation (5G) wireless technology
 Noise reduction, the process of removing noise from a signal
 Numerical Recipes, a series of books on numerical computation

Other uses in science and technology
 Nanorod, in nanotechnology and materials science
 Non-redundant sequence clustering, in genetics and bioinformatics
 NR Vulpeculae, a red supergiant star

Other uses 
 NR class, an Australian diesel locomotive
 Non Resident Nepali (NRN)